Ned Rothenberg (born September 15, 1956) is an American multi-instrumentalist and composer. He specializes in woodwind instruments, including the alto saxophone, clarinet, bass clarinet, flute, and shakuhachi (Japanese bamboo flute). He is known for his work in contemporary classical and free improvisation. Rothenberg is a graduate of the Oberlin Conservatory of Music. He was a founding member of the woodwind trio New Winds with J. D. Parran and Robert Dick. He has performed with Samm Bennett, Paul Dresher, Fred Frith, Evan Parker, Marc Ribot, Elliott Sharp, John Zorn, Yuji Takahashi, Sainkho Namtchylak, and Katsuya Yokoyama.

Discography

As leader
 Trials of the Argo (Lumina, 1981)
 Portal (Lumina, 1983)
 Trespass (Lumina, 1986)
 Overlays (Moers, 1991)
 Opposites Attract with Paul Dresher (New World, 1991)
 Power Lines (New World, 1995)
 Real and Imagined Time (Moers, 1995)
 Amulet with Sainkho (Leo, 1996)
 Monkey Puzzle with Evan Parker (Leo, 1997)
 Port of Entry (Intuition, 1998)
 Ghost Stories (Tzadik, 2000)
 Tools of The Trade with Denman Maroney, (CIMP, 2001)
 Intervals (Animul, 2002)
 Decisive Action with Satoh Masahiko (BAJ, 2004)
 En Passant with Peter A. Schmid (Creative Works, 2004)
 Harbinger (Animul, 2004)
 Falling into Place with Slava Ganelin (Auris Media, 2006)
 El Nino with Matthias Ziegler, Peter A. Schmid (Creative Works, 2006)
 Live at Roulette with Evan Parker (Animul, 2007)
 The Fell Clutch with Tony Buck, Stomu Takeishi (Animul, 2007)
 Inner Diaspora (Tzadik, 2007)
 While You Were Out with Catherine Jauniaux, Barre Phillips (Kadima Collective, 2009)
 Free Zone Appleby 2007 with Evan Parker, Paolo Angeli (psi, 2009)
 Live at DOM with Vladimir Volkov (Dom, 2010)
 Quintet for Clarinet and Strings (Tzadik, 2010)
 Ryu Nashi/No School-New Music for Shakuhachi (Tzadik, 2010)
 World of Odd Harmonics (Tzadik, 2012)
 In Cahoots with Mark Feldman, Sylvie Courvoisier, (Clean Feed, 2016)
  Strings 2 with Perelman/Maneri/Roberts (Leo, 2018)

With New Winds
 The Cliff (Sound Aspects, 1989)
 Traction (Sound Aspects, 1991)
 Digging It Harder from Afar (Les Disques Victo, 1995)
 Potion (Les Disques Victo, 1998)

With Semantics
 Semantics (Review, 1986)
 Bone of Contention (SST, 1987)

As sideman
With Anthony Braxton
 Creative Orchestra (Köln) 1978 (hatART, 1995)
 Trillium R (Braxton House, 1999)
 Orchestra (Paris) 1978 (Braxton Bootleg, 2011)

With Robert Dick
 Venturi Shadows (OODiscs, 1991)
  Worlds of If (Leo, 1995)

With Kip Hanrahan
 Desire Develops an Edge (American Clave, 1983)
 Kip Hanrahan, Vertical's Currency (American Clave, 1985)

With Denman Maroney
 Fluxations (New World, 2003)
 Gaga (Nuscope, 2008)
 Udentity (Clean Feed, 2009)

With Steve Nieve
 Mumu (Silvertone, 2001)
  Welcome to the Voice (Deutsche Grammophon, 2007)

With Evan Parker
 The Moment's Energy (ECM, 2009)
 Evan Parker, Hasselt (psi, 2012)
 Evan Parker, Seven ElectroAcoustic Septet (Les Disques Victo, 2014)

With Marc Ribot
 Music from the Performance Inasmuch As Life Is Borrowed (Ultima Vez, 2001)
 Scelsi Morning (Tzadik, 2003)
 Soundtracks II (Tzadik, 2003)

With Adam Rudolph
 Dream Garden (Justin Time, 2008)
 Can You Imagine...The Sound of a Dream (Meta, 2011)

With Steve Swell
 Flurries Warm and Clear (CIMP, 2000)
 Kanreki: Reflection & Renewal (Not Two, 2015)

With John Zorn
 The Big Gundown (Nonesuch, 1986)
 Music Romance Volume III: The Gift (Tzadik, 2001)
 Dictee Liber Novus (Tzadik, 2010)

With others
 Anthony Coleman, Lapidation (New World, 2008)
 Samm Bennett, The Big Off (Factory Outlet, 1993)
 Elvis Costello, The Juliet Letters (Rhino, 2006)
 Marty Ehrlich, The Long View (Enja, 2002)
 Nicolas Collins, 100 of The World's Most Beautiful Melodies (Trace Elements, 1989)
 Heiner Goebbels, Heiner Mueller, Der Mann Im Fahrstuhl (ECM, 1988)
 Phil Haynes Herb Robertson 5tet, Brooklyn-Berlin (CIMP, 2000)
 Jason Hwang, Unfolding Stone (Sound Aspects, 1990)
 Sato Michihiro, Rodan (hat ART, 1989)
 Marisa Monte, Green, Blue, Yellow, Rose and Charcoal (Metro Blue, 1994)
 Sainkho Namtchylak, Stepmother City (Ponderosa Music & Art, 2000)
 Roy Nathanson, Fire at Keaton's Bar & Grill (Six Degrees, 2000)
 Bob Ostertag, Bob Ostertag Plays the Serge 1978–1983 (Analogue Motions Studio, 2014)
 Bobby Previte, The 23 Constellations of Joan Miro (Tzadik, 2001)
 Liu Sola, Blues in the East (Axiom, 1994)
 Elliott Sharp, Radiolaria (Zoar, 2001)
 Daniel Zamir, Children of Israel (Tzadik, 2002)

References

External links
 Official site
 [ Allmusic entry]
 Interview with Ned Rothenberg by Sasha Burov (April 23, 2004) from Paris Transatlantic magazine
 Video interview by Derk Richardson for radiOM

1956 births
Living people
Jazz musicians from Massachusetts
Musicians from Boston
Oberlin College alumni
21st-century American male musicians
21st-century clarinetists
21st-century American saxophonists
American jazz bass clarinetists
American male saxophonists
Avant-garde clarinetists
Avant-garde jazz clarinetists
Avant-garde jazz musicians
Jewish American jazz composers
Jewish American musicians
Jewish jazz musicians
American male jazz composers
American jazz composers
Shakuhachi players
Leo Records artists
Tzadik Records artists
21st-century American Jews
21st-century flautists